Edmond Francis Prendergast (May 3, 1843 – February 26, 1918) was an Irish-born prelate of the Catholic Church. He served as the third Archbishop of Philadelphia from 1911 until his death in 1918.

Biography
Edmond Prendergast was born in Clonmel, County Tipperary, Ireland, to Lawrence and Joanna (née Carew) Prendergast. Three of his uncles and two brothers were also priests, and two sisters entered religious life. While a theological student in his native country, he accepted an invitation from one of his uncles to come to the United States in 1859. He then enrolled at St. Charles Borromeo Seminary in Philadelphia, Pennsylvania, where he proved to be a talented student. He was ordained to the priesthood by Bishop James Frederick Wood on November 17, 1865.

Prendergast then served as a curate at St. Paul's Church in Philadelphia until May 1866, when he was transferred to the mission in Susquehanna Depot on account of his health. He was pastor of St. Mark's Church in Bristol from 1867 to 1871. He then served at Immaculate Conception Church in Allentown until February 1874, when he returned to Philadelphia as rector of St. Malachy's Church. In addition to his duties at St. Malachy's, he was named vicar general of the Archdiocese of Philadelphia in 1895. He also served as director of the St. Vincent de Paul Society.

On November 27, 1895, Prendergast was appointed Auxiliary Bishop of Philadelphia and Titular Bishop of Scilium by Pope Leo XIII. He received his episcopal consecration on February 24, 1897 from Archbishop Patrick John Ryan, with Bishops Ignatius Frederick Horstmann and Michael John Hoban serving as co-consecrators, at the Cathedral of Sts. Peter and Paul. For 15 years he continued his work as vicar general and pastor of St. Malachy's, and assisted Archbishop Ryan in ordaining priests, administering Confirmation, dedicating churches, chapels and schools, officiating at the reception of novices and at the solemn profession of numerous nuns in the archdiocese. He also served as chairman of the Archdiocesan Building Committee; under his leadership, the Catholic Protectory for Boys, Archbishop Ryan Memorial Library, Catholic Home for Girls, and Catholic Girls' High School were erected. Following the death of Archbishop Ryan in February 1911, he was named Apostolic Administrator.

Archbishop
Prendergast was named the third Archbishop of Philadelphia by Pope Pius X on May 27, 1911. He was later installed at the Cathedral of Sts. Peter and Paul on July 26, 1911. In attendance at his installation was the likes of Mayor John E. Reyburn and Judge Mayer Sulzberger. Due to his own advanced age (68), he received John Joseph McCort as an auxiliary in 1912. During his episcopate, he was known as a master builder and a real-estate genius.  He increased the number of parishes and parochial schools for the great number of Italian and Eastern European immigrants in Philadelphia. In 1913 he opened the Archbishop Memorial Institute for the Deaf. He founded Saint Francis Country Home for Convalescents and in 1916 established Saint Edmond's Home to meet the needs of children affected by the polio epidemic. In 1917 he founded St. Vincent's Orphanage, which would later become Archbishop Prendergast High School.

Archbishop Prendergast was esteemed by priests and laity as a friend and solicitous father. He died at the episcopal residence on February 26, 1918.

In 2005 Archbishop Prendergast High School for Young Women in Drexel Hill, Pennsylvania, merged with Monsignor Bonner High School for Young Men to create Monsignor Bonner & Archbishop Prendergast Catholic High School.

References

External links

1843 births
1918 deaths
19th-century Irish people
20th-century Irish people
20th-century Roman Catholic archbishops in the United States
Roman Catholic archbishops of Philadelphia
American Roman Catholic clergy of Irish descent
Irish emigrants to the United States (before 1923)
People from County Tipperary
Clergy from Philadelphia
Burials at the Cathedral Basilica of Saints Peter and Paul (Philadelphia)